The Lamerton House is a historic house constructed in 1930 located on the  Lamerton Terrace property Enid, Oklahoma in Garfield County.

Description and history 
The two-story Tudor Revival style home was designed in 1928 by John Duncan Forsyth of Tulsa, Oklahoma for Dr. William E. Lamerton and his wife, Grace T. Lamerton. Forsyth also designed a Colonial Revival style home for Park Lamerton, the couple's son. The Lamertons developed their acreage into the Lamerton Terrace (1932), Lamerton's 2nd Addition (1952), and Lamerton's 3rd Addition (1954).

It was listed on the National Register of Historic Places on June 20, 1997.

References

Houses on the National Register of Historic Places in Oklahoma
Houses completed in 1930
Buildings and structures in Enid, Oklahoma
Houses in Garfield County, Oklahoma
Tudor Revival architecture in Oklahoma
National Register of Historic Places in Garfield County, Oklahoma